"If You're Not Gone Too Long" is a song written by Wanda Ballman.  It was originally recorded by American country artist Loretta Lynn. It was released as a single in May 1967 via Decca Records.

Background and reception 
"If You're Not Gone Too Long" was recorded at the Bradley's Barn on January 18, 1967. Located in Nashville, Tennessee, the session was produced by renowned country music producer Owen Bradley. Three additional tracks were recorded during this session.

The song was covered by American country artist Reba McEntire for a tribute to Lynn in 2010 entitled Coal Miner's Daughter: A Tribute to Loretta Lynn.

"If You're Not Gone Too Long" reached number seven on the Billboard Hot Country Singles survey in 1967. The song became her tenth top ten single under the Decca recording label. It was included on her studio album, Singin' with Feelin' (1967).

Track listings 
7" vinyl single
 "The Home You're Tearing Down" – 2:44
 "Farther to Go" – 2:24

Charts

Weekly charts

References 

1967 songs
1967 singles
Decca Records singles
Loretta Lynn songs
Song recordings produced by Owen Bradley